Charles Orval Biggs (September 15, 1906 – May 24, 1954) was a Major League Baseball pitcher who played for the Chicago White Sox in .

External links

1906 births
1954 deaths
Chicago White Sox players
Major League Baseball pitchers
Baseball players from Indiana
People from French Lick, Indiana